The elegant water shrew (Nectogale elegans) is a species of mammal in the subfamily Soricinae of the family Soricidae. It is the only species within the genus Nectogale. It lives in Sikkim and China.

References

Mammals described in 1870
Red-toothed shrews
Taxonomy articles created by Polbot